Chorley Borough Council elections are generally held three years out of every four, with a third of the council elected each time. Chorley Borough Council is the local authority for the non-metropolitan district of Chorley in Lancashire, England. Since the last boundary changes in 2020, 42 councillors have been elected from 14 wards.

Political control
From 1881 to 1974, Chorley had been a municipal borough. Under the Local Government Act 1972 the borough became a non-metropolitan district and had its territory enlarged, gaining the area of the abolished Adlington Urban District, Withnell Urban District and Chorley Rural District. The first election to the reformed borough council was held in 1973, initially operating as a shadow authority before the new arrangements took effect on 1 April 1974. Political control of the council since 1973 has been held by the following parties:

Leadership
The leaders of the council since 1990 have been:

Council elections
1973 Chorley Borough Council election
1976 Chorley Borough Council election (New ward boundaries)
1979 Chorley Borough Council election
1980 Chorley Borough Council election
1982 Chorley Borough Council election
1983 Chorley Borough Council election
1984 Chorley Borough Council election
1986 Chorley Borough Council election
1987 Chorley Borough Council election (Borough boundary changes took place but the number of seats remained the same)
1988 Chorley Borough Council election
1990 Chorley Borough Council election
1991 Chorley Borough Council election
1992 Chorley Borough Council election
1994 Chorley Borough Council election (Borough boundary changes took place but the number of seats remained the same)
1995 Chorley Borough Council election
1998 Chorley Borough Council election
1999 Chorley Borough Council election
2000 Chorley Borough Council election
2002 Chorley Borough Council election (New ward boundaries)
2003 Chorley Borough Council election
2004 Chorley Borough Council election
2006 Chorley Borough Council election
2007 Chorley Borough Council election
2008 Chorley Borough Council election
2010 Chorley Borough Council election
2011 Chorley Borough Council election
2012 Chorley Borough Council election
2014 Chorley Borough Council election
2015 Chorley Borough Council election
2016 Chorley Borough Council election
2018 Chorley Borough Council election
2019 Chorley Borough Council election
2021 Chorley Borough Council election (New Ward Boundaries)
2022 Chorley Borough Council election

Borough result maps

By-election results

References

 Chorley election results
 By-election results

External links
Chorley Borough Council

 
District council elections in England
Council elections in Lancashire
Local government in Chorley
Politics of Chorley